is a passenger railway station on the Minato Line in the city of Hitachinaka, Ibaraki, Japan, operated by the third-sector railway operator Hitachinaka Seaside Railway.

Lines

Station layout
The station is unstaffed and consists of a single side platform with a simple passenger waiting shelter.

History
Nakane Station opened on 16 July 1931.

Passenger statistics
In fiscal 2011, the station was used by an average of 22 passengers daily.

Surrounding area
Nakane Onsen
Torazuka kofun

See also
 List of railway stations in Japan

References

External links

 Hitachinaka Seaside Railway station information 

Railway stations in Ibaraki Prefecture
Railway stations in Japan opened in 1931
Hitachinaka, Ibaraki